Robert Lussier (December 31, 1924 – March 19, 1994) was a Canadian politician and a Member of the Legislative Assembly of Quebec.

Background

He was born on December 31, 1924, in Richmond, Eastern Townships and became a physician.  He was married to Ginette Bruneau in 1952.

Mayor

Lussier served as Mayor of Repentigny, Lanaudière from 1960 to 1968.

Member of the Provincial Legislature

He ran as a Union Nationale candidate to the Legislative Assembly of Quebec in the provincial district of L'Assomption in the 1966 election and won against Liberal incumbent Frédéric Coiteux.  He served as a parliamentary assistant in 1967 and was appointed to the Cabinet in the same year.  He served as Minister of Municipal Affairs until his defeat against Liberal candidate  in the 1970 election.

Parti Québécois Supporter

In the 1970s, Lussier became a Parti Québécois activist and held executive jobs within the party structure.  He was a mayoral candidate in Repentigny in 1977, but was defeated.

Death

He died on March 19, 1994.

References

1924 births
1994 deaths
Mayors of places in Quebec
Union Nationale (Quebec) MNAs